Mao Yi (born 16 September 1999) is a Chinese artistic gymnast. She won the silver medal with the team in 2015 World Gymnastic Championships. 
She competed in the 2016 Olympic Games, where she and her teammates won a bronze medal in the team event.

Senior career
Mao started her senior career in 2015. She was selected into the National Team in February, 2015. In May, she competed at the 2015 Chinese National Championships, winning silver with the Shanghai Team. She also placed fourth in the all-around, eighth on both balance beam and floor.

Later, she made her international debut at the 2015 Asian Championships in Hiroshima, Japan, where she won silver with the Chinese Team and placed seventh on floor Noticeably, she upgraded her vault from a Yurchenko (D4.4) to a Double Twisting Yurchenko (D5.8) since her training at the National Team.

Mao was named to compete at the 2015 World Championships, where she won silver with the team.

In 2016 after finishing 2nd in the all around at Chinese Nationals, Mao was named to the Rio 2016 Olympic Team. At the Olympics in Rio de Janeiro, Brazil, she helped the Chinese team win the bronze medal in the Team event. 

In 2018 Mao was selected to compete in the American Cup, in Chicago, Illinois. During the first rotation she fell on her vault, breaking her left femur. She was taken to hospital, where she underwent thigh bone surgery.

Competitive history

References

1999 births
Living people
Hakka sportspeople
Chinese female artistic gymnasts
Olympic medalists in gymnastics
Olympic gymnasts of China
Gymnasts at the 2016 Summer Olympics
2016 Olympic bronze medalists for China
Medalists at the World Artistic Gymnastics Championships
People from Ganzhou
Gymnasts from Jiangxi
21st-century Chinese women